Janet is a feminine given name meaning "God is gracious or gift from God". It is the feminine form of John. It is a variation of the French proper noun Jeannette, Spanish proper noun Juanita, Russian Жанет (Zhanet), Circassian Джэнэт (Janet), and Hungarian Zsanett. It is also the diminutive of Jeanne or Jane.

List of people with the given name Janet
 Janet Adamson (1882–1962), Scottish politician
 Janet Amos, Canadian actress, theatre director, educator and playwright
 Janet Beery, American mathematician and historian of mathematics
 Janet Carr, Australian physiotherapist
 Janet Cooke (born 1954), disgraced American journalist, forced to return a Pulitzer Prize for a fabricated story
 Janet Ellis (born 1955), British television presenter
 Janet Evans, American Olympic Champion swimmer
 Janet Fielding, Australian Actress
 Janet Fockart (died 1596), Scottish merchant and moneylender
 Janet Franklin, American geographer and landscape ecologist
 Janet Gaynor, American actress
 Janet Grogan, Irish Singer Songwriter
 Janet Guthrie (born 1938), American race driver
 Janet Holm (1923–2018), New Zealand environmental activist and historian
 Janette Husárová, Slovak tennis player
 Janet Jackson (born 1966), American singer, songwriter, dancer, and actress
 Janet Jagan, Prime Minister of Guyana 1997, President of Guyana 1997–1999
 Janet Kigusiuq (1926–2005), Inuit artist
 Janet Lacey (1903–1988), English charity director and philanthropist 
 Janet Lee Bouvier, US socialite, mother of the First Lady Jacqueline Kennedy
 Janet Leigh (1927–2004), American actress
 Janet Lennon, American singer
 Janet Cook Lewis (1855-1947), American librarian and book repairer
 Janet Lupo (1959–2017), Playboy model
 Janet Lynn, American figure skater
 Janet Maratita, politician from the Northern Mariana Islands
 Janet Margolin (1943–1993), American actress
 Janet Maslin, American journalist
 Janet McTeer (born 1961), British actress
 Janet Munsil, Canadian playwright
 Janet Lim-Napoles (born 1964), Chinese-Filipino businesswoman and convict
 Janet Napolitano, American politician
 Janet Nungnik (born 1954), Inuit textile artist
 Janet Perlman (born 1954), Canadian animator and children's book author and illustrator
 Janet Meakin Poor, American landscape designer
 Janet Reed (1916–2000), American ballerina and ballet mistress
 Janet Reno, former Attorney General of the United States
 Janet Rono (born 1988), Kenyan marathon runner
 Janet Smith (disambiguation), various people
 Janet L. Smith (born 1951), American scientist
 Janet Street-Porter, British media personality
 Janet Waldo, American actress and voice-over artist
 Janet Watt, New Zealand female badminton player 
 Janet Wittes, American statistician
 Janet C. Wolfenbarger, lieutenant general and highest-ranking woman in the United States Air Force
 Janet Wright, Canadian actress and theater director
 Janet Yates, Irish archer
 Janet Yellen, American economist and Federal Reserve Chair
 Janet Suzman, British-South African actress
 Janet Zarish (born 1954), American actress, director, and teacher

Fictional characters with the given name Janet
Janet, a character in The Good Place
Janet, a character in Brawl Stars
 Janet Barch, a character in Daria
 Janet Cunningham, a character in The Final Destination
 Janet Chant, a character in Diana Wynne Jones' Chrestomanci series
 Janet Drake, mother of Timothy Drake 
 Janet van Dyne, aka the Wasp, a superhero in the Marvel Universe
 Janet Fraiser, a character in Stargate SG-1
Janet Keogh , a primary character in Two Pints of Lager and a Packet of Crisps
Janet Kim, a primary character in Kim's Convenience
Janet Pearson, a character in 1989 American independent coming of age comedy movie She's Out of Control
 Janet Weiss, a character in The Rocky Horror Picture Show
 Janet Wood, a character in Three's Company
Janet, the heroine of Tam Lin. Alternately named Margaret in several versions
Janet, a character in Quake Live

Circassian feminine given names
English feminine given names
English-language feminine given names
Feminine given names